Leonard Johnson or Len Johnson may refer to:

Leonard Johnson (American football) (born 1990), American football player
Leonard Johnson (baseball), American baseball player
Len Johnson (American football) (born 1946), American football player
Len Johnson (cricketer) (1919–1977), Australian cricketer
Leonard V. Johnson, Canadian politician
Len Johnson (footballer) (1908–1942), Australian rules footballer
Leonard G. Johnson (born 1953), American inventor and entrepreneur
Len Johnson (boxer) (1902–1974), professional boxer of the 1920s and 1930s

See also
Ernest Leonard Johnson (died ), South African astronomer